Geoscaptus is a genus of beetles in the family Carabidae, containing the following species:

 Geoscaptus cacus (W. J. Macleay, 1863)
 Geoscaptus crassus Sloane, 1895
 Geoscaptus laevissimus Chaudoir, 1855
 Geoscaptus macleayi Chaudoir, 1879
 Geoscaptus plicatulus (Laporte, 1867)

Parasites
In Australia, Geoscaptus laevissimus is parasitized by a species of mite, Eutarsopolipus paryavae Katlav & Hajiqanbar, 2021 (Heterostigmatina) which dwells under the elytra.

References

Scaritinae